Henry Unton or Umpton (c. 1535 – 1555 or later) was an English politician. He has been identified as a stepson of Robert Keilway, brother to Edward Unton and so uncle to Henry Unton the diplomat. In November 1554, he was MP for Heytesbury (UK Parliament constituency).

References

1535 births
16th-century deaths
English MPs 1554–1555